Notable events of 2017 in webcomics.

Events

Awards
 Eisner Awards, "Best Webcomic" won by Anne Szabla's Bird Boy.
 Ignatz Awards, "Outstanding Online Comic" won by Der-Shing Helmer's The Meek.
 Joe Shuster Awards, "Outstanding Webcomic Creator" won by Ty Templeton (Bun Toons).
 Reuben Awards, "Online Comics"; Short Form won by Ruben Bolling's Donald and John, Long Form won by Ngozi Ukazu's Check, Please!.
 Ringo Awards, "Best Webcomic" won by Dean Haspiel's The Red Hook.
 Cartoonist Studio Prize, "Best Web Comic" won by Christina Tran's On Beauty.
 Special Prometheus Award won by Mark Stanley's Freefall.

Webcomics started

 January 1 — Live with Yourself! by Shen and David Mercier
 January 10 — Leaving Richard's Valley by Michael DeForge
 March 6 — My Giant Nerd Boyfriend by Fishball
 March 8 — Woman World by Aminder Dhaliwal
 March 12 — My Dear Cold-Blooded King by lifelight
 March 18 — Dogeza de Tanondemita by Kazuki Funatsu
 April — Days of Hana by Seok-woo
 April 2 — Ghost Teller by QTT and Studio LICO
 April 7 — I Love Yoo by Quimchee
 May 12 — Cheshire Crossing (2nd version) by Andy Weir and Sarah Andersen
 June — SandSerif by Sandy
 June 6 — Honey Honey Wedding by Moon Na-young
 July — Winter Moon by Merryweathery
 July 5 — 17776 by Jon Bois
 August 6 — A Good Day to be a Dog by Lee Hey
September 7 — We're Out of Cornflakes by Wedeking
 October 3 — Nothing Special by Katie Cook
 October 12 — Sweet Home by Kim Carnby and Hwang Young-chan
 November 7 — Let's Play by Mongie
 November 7 — 1000 by Chuck Brown and Sanford Greene
 December 5 — War Cry by Dean Haspiel
 Acception by Coco “Colourbee” Ouwerkerk

Webcomics ended
 The Adventures of Dr. McNinja by Christopher Hastings, 2004 – 2017
 Multiplex by Gordon McAlpin, 2005 – 2017
 The Dreamland Chronicles by Scott Christian Sava, 2006 – 2017
 Octopus Pie by Meredith Gran, 2007 – 2017
 Mob Psycho 100 by One, 2012 – 2017
 Snarlbear by Natalie Riess, 2012 – 2017
 Cheese in the Trap by Soonkki
 My ID is Gangnam Beauty by Gi Maeng-gi, 2016 – 2017
 unTouchable by massstar, 2014 – 2017
 Winter Woods by Cosmos and Van Ji, 2014 – 2017
 ShootAround by suspu, 2015 – 2017
 17776 by Jon Bois, 2017 – 2017
 The Purple Heart by Vito Delsante / Ricardo Venâncio

References

 
Webcomics by year